also known in Australia and Europe as Phantasy Star: ZERO and sometimes in North America as Phantasy Star Ø, is a Nintendo DS game in the Phantasy Star series, developed by Sonic Team and published by Sega. The game was released in Japan on December 25, 2008; in North America on November 10, 2009; and in Europe on February 12, 2010. The game expands on the gameplay mechanics of Phantasy Star Online, partly by borrowing some elements from fellow online Phantasy Star title Phantasy Star Universe, such as a fully realized story mode for offline play.

Character generation and archetypes
Phantasy Star Zero continues the character creation mechanics from Phantasy Star Online. The player first chooses a race, each with their own strengths: versatile Humans; powerful, hulking androids called CASTs; or nimble but fragile genetically engineered Newmans. The choice affects the character's perspective on the story and what order in which the first three zones are tackled, but ultimately all three end identically. The player then chooses the character's gender and archetype. Males tend to favor physical strength and durability; females tend to favor accuracy, evasion and techniques, Phantasy Star's equivalent to magic.

Hunters
Hunters use short ranged weapons like swords daggers and spears. Human and Newman hunters may also wield empowering techniques.

Rangers
Rangers are primarily ranged attackers. They are most effective fighting at long range with various guns and heavy artillery, but can also make use of gunblades. Human rangers can also use de-powering techniques on targets. Newmans cannot become rangers.

Forces
Forces excel at using techniques. Techniques are used to buff and heal teammates and debuff and damage enemies. Though all Humans and Newmans can use some techniques, only forces can use the light-based Grants and dark-based Megid and only forces can learn the higher-tier ranks of all techniques. Forces favor technique weapons such as staffs and wands. This archetype is unavailable to CASTs.

NPCs
There are also four non playable characters who can accompany the player during story mode:

Sarisa: A cheerful and sunny newman youth who came down from the moon. She is an avid book reader with a love of adventure stories, and is a skill-type character due to her weak defenses and strong healing techniques.

Ogi: One of the best hunters in Dairon City's Hunter's Guild, who is deeply interested in the past due to his amnesia, shared by many CASTs. He is a balanced character, but is unable to use techniques.

Kai: A top hunter in Dairon City's Hunter's Guild. He generally acts in a carefree manner, but he has faced great tragedy in the past, and is something of a father figure for the player character and Sarisa. He is a power-type character.

Reve: An elite newman in Mother Trinity's police force. He joins the player after having his faith shaken. He has great skill with lightning techniques and is a speed-type character.

Gameplay

Online and offline modes
Similar to Phantasy Star Online, players can shop, bank, accept quests, and access combat areas from a city-like hub. In the offline Story Mode, the player gains AI allies and progresses a narrative, which includes multiple cut scenes and dialogue sequences. Once completed, the player can access higher difficulty levels to earn increasingly powerful gear and further grow their characters. The game also contains three online modes: Free Play, in which the player is randomly paired up with a party of one to three users; Play With Friends, where the player can invite friends into a private room (and vice versa); and Play Alone, where the player can play online by oneself to complete online-only missions and be notified of friends' connection status.

Communication
Featured in the game is "Visual Chat", a take on PictoChat where players communicate by drawing and writing on the DS touch screen. According to the February 2009 issue of Nintendo Power (Vol. 238, page 38), "Up to 20 messages may be saved to shortcuts so they're accessible at any time via a quick tap of the touch screen". Players can also write freely to each other throughout a game session without the use of pre-composed messages. However, communication among unfamiliar users is limited to preset chat. Even considering its limitations, the preset phrases offer an unprecedented amount of communication between anonymous users from anywhere in the world over Nintendo Wi-Fi Connection. Players will receive the preset phrase in their own languages as well as the speakers'.

Gear and character optimization
The game contains over 350 weapons, debuting two new weapon classes, shields and gunblades. Shields are blunt weapons that can be used to block enemy attacks, and gunblades are one-handed swords that also carry a gun barrel, allowing for long range and short range interchangeability by holding the Left Trigger button. Most equipment can be upgraded through various means. Items called grinders can further improve a weapon or armor's effectiveness. In addition, weapons can be upgraded with elements, allowing them special on-hit effects or additional damage, and "Photon Fortification," which increases a weapon's effectiveness against a hostile classification of the player's choosing. Characters can be further specialized by using materials, items that permanently increase a base stat.

Development
The decision to develop Phantasy Star 0 for the Nintendo DS was made to expand the appeal of the series to younger gamers. The word Zero was affixed to the title to represent "a new start for the series" and separate itself from the main series games in favor of the Nintendo GameCube games. Artist Toshiyuki Kubooka, made famous by his work on the Lunar series and Giant Robo anime, designed the game's characters with an "uplifting" aesthetic. The game was exhibited at Tokyo Game Show (TGS) 2008 as part of Sega's lineup of new DS games.

DSiWare version
A smaller version of the game, Phantasy Star 0 Mini, was released for the Nintendo DSiWare service on March 25, 2009. Sega also mentioned the possibility of a new Nintendo DSi-exclusive downloadable stage for the game, possibly one from the original Phantasy Star Online. A poll for players to pick their favorite classic stage would be held on Sega of Japan's website at a later date.

Reception

The game received "average" reviews according to the review aggregation website Metacritic.

Famitsu gave it a score of two eights, one nine, and one eight for a total of 33 out of 40; the authors praised the game's controls, game play, and online mode, noting, "it really feels like an online game in the palm of your hand." The publication criticized the game's "softness of the sound." Nintendo Power gave good remarks towards the game, but heavily criticized the menu setup and the loss to change weapons during gameplay. Phantasy Star 0 sold approximately 84,055 copies during its debut week in Japan.

Notes

References

External links
Official website 
Phantasy Star 0 Mini at Nintendo.co.jp 

2008 video games
Cooperative video games
Multiplayer online games
Nintendo DS games
Nintendo DS-only games
Phantasy Star video games
Role-playing video games
Sega video games
Single-player online games
Sonic Team games
Video games featuring protagonists of selectable gender
DSiWare games
Video games developed in Japan